This is a list of members of the Tasmanian Legislative Council from 2010 to 2014. Terms of the Legislative Council do not coincide with House of Assembly elections, with members serving six-year terms, and two or three members facing re-election every year. The members have been categorised here according to the four-year terms of the House of Assembly so as to avoid the need for separate member lists for each year.

1 Apsley MLC Tania Rattray was re-elected unopposed at the 2010 periodic elections. Elwick MLC Terry Martin retired, and the election for his seat was won by Adriana Taylor.
2 Murchison MLC Ruth Forrest was re-elected unopposed at the 2011 periodic elections. Launceston MLC Don Wing retired and was replaced by fellow independent Rosemary Armitage, while Rumney Labor MLC Lin Thorp was defeated by independent candidate Tony Mulder. In a by-election held on the same day to replace Derwent MLC Labor Michael Aird, Labor candidate Craig Farrell was elected.
3 Western Tiers MLC Greg Hall was re-elected at the 2012 periodic elections. Hobart MLC Doug Parkinson retired, and the election for his seat was won by former Lord Mayor of Hobart Rob Valentine.

Members of Tasmanian parliaments by term
21st-century Australian politicians